The explosion of the paddle steamer Saluda, near Lexington, Missouri, in 1852, was one of the worst disasters in Missouri River history.

In March 1852, Saluda left St. Louis for Council Bluffs, Iowa, carrying many Mormon immigrants from England and Wales. The river was muddy, icy, and running high as Saluda stopped at Lexington for supplies before continuing her journey.  Just beyond Lexington, a narrow channel with very strong currents made it difficult for ships to make a sharp turn in the river. Saludas Captain, Francis T. Belt, tried unsuccessfully for two days to make the bend. On Good Friday morning, 9 April 1852, Captain Belt, frustrated by the lack of progress, ordered an increase in steam pressure.  Saluda pushed off, but before the paddlewheel got through its second rotation, the boilers exploded. The explosion could be heard for miles. Those watching from the bluffs in Lexington saw parts of the steamer and bodies blown into the air. They landed in the river, on the wharf, and even on the nearby bluff.

Over 100 people were killed, including Captain Belt, many of the passengers, and two men on shore who were hit by debris. Because of the strong current, many bodies were never recovered.  Only 40 to 50 people survived. Some of the survivors were pulled onto a passing boat heading down the Missouri River. Within ten minutes of the explosion, Saluda had sunk.

The community of Lexington rushed to help. Doctors worked on the injured, while survivors were cared for in local homes. A fund was raised to bury the dead in local Macpelah Cemetery, as well as to help with the financial needs of the survivors.  The townspeople in Lexington took some of the orphaned children into their homes and raised them as their own.

See also 
Lexington Historical Museum

References

Further reading
 Hartley, William G., and Fred E. Woods, "Explosion of the Steamboat Saluda: Tragedy and Compassion at Lexington, Missouri, 1852," Missouri Historical Review 99 (July 2005), 281-305.

Disasters in Missouri
Missouri River
Mormon migration to Utah
Shipwrecks of the Missouri River
Steamships
Latter Day Saint movement in Missouri
Steamboats of the Missouri River
Transportation disasters in Missouri
Maritime incidents in April 1852
1852 in Missouri